Malá Čausa is a village and municipality in Prievidza District in the Trenčín Region of western Slovakia.

History
In historical records the village was first mentioned in 1430.

Geography
The municipality lies at an elevation of 350 metres (1,148 ft) and covers an area of 15.349 km² (5.926 mi²). It has a population of about 621.

External links
 
 
https://web.archive.org/web/20070513023228/http://www.statistics.sk/mosmis/eng/run.html

Villages and municipalities in Prievidza District